The 63rd Drive–Rego Park station is a local station on the IND Queens Boulevard Line of the New York City Subway, consisting of four tracks. Located at 63rd Drive and Queens Boulevard in the Rego Park neighborhood of Queens, it is served by the M train on weekdays, the R train at all times except nights, and the E and F trains at night.

History 
The Queens Boulevard Line was one of the first lines built by the city-owned Independent Subway System (IND), and stretches between the IND Eighth Avenue Line in Manhattan and 179th Street and Hillside Avenue in Jamaica, Queens. The Queens Boulevard Line was in part financed by a Public Works Administration (PWA) loan and grant of $25 million.

Station layout 

There are four tracks and two side platforms; the two center express tracks are used by the E and F trains at all times except late nights. Both platforms have a Medium Powder blue trim line with a black border and mosaic name tablets reading "63RD DRIVE" in white sans-serif lettering on a black background and matching blue border. A few of these tablets have modern metal signs above them reading "Rego Park". Small tile captions reading "63RD DRIVE" in white lettering on black run below the trim line, and directional signs in the same style are present below some of the name tablets. Dark slate blue I-beam columns run along both platforms at regular intervals, alternating ones having the standard black station name plate with white lettering.

This station has an upper level mezzanine that is about one-third the length of the platforms. The mezzanine is split into three sections by a wall on the southbound side and a chain link fence on the northbound side. Numerous staircases from each platform go up to their respective outer section of the mezzanine. A small turnstile bank on the southbound side and exit-only turnstiles on the northbound side lead to the main fare control area.

Exits

Towards the northwest end of the mezzanine, a single extra-wide staircase from each platform goes up to a crossover, where a turnstile bank leads to the main fare control area. There is a token booth and two street stairs, one to the northwest corner of 63rd Drive and Queens Boulevard and the other to the south side of Queens Boulevard near this intersection.

On the southeast side of the mezzanine, high entry-exit turnstiles from either outer section lead to an un-staffed fare control area, where one street stair goes up to the northwest corner of 64th Avenue and Queens Boulevard while the other goes up to the south side of Queens Boulevard near the intersection with 64th Road. The mezzanine has mosaic directional signs in white lettering on a teal border. The center section connects the two fare control areas, but provides no crossover.

On the extreme northwest (railroad south) end of the platforms, high turnstiles lead to a single staircase that goes up to either western corners of 63rd Road and Queens Boulevard, the northwest one for the Manhattan-bound platform and the southwest one for the Forest Hills-bound platform. Prior to 2010, these entry points were exit-only. They were made entrances to accommodate traffic from the expansion of Rego Center.

Unfinished Rockaway spur 
East of this station, there is an unfinished signal tower on the Jamaica-bound (railroad north) platform and a bellmouth that diverges to the south from the local track. Another tunnel from the Manhattan-bound local track diverges north, then curves south under the Queens Boulevard Line to join the other bellmouth. These were provisions for a planned expansion in the 1930s that would have connected with the IND Rockaway Line (formerly a Long Island Rail Road branch) towards Howard Beach, JFK Airport, and the Rockaways. This spur would have run down 66th Avenue before joining the Rockaway Line at its former junction with the LIRR Main Line. In January 2013, a petition was started on change.org to make use of the bellmouths to connect the station to the currently unused portion of the Rockaway Line.

References

External links 

 
 
 Station Reporter — R Train
 Station Reporter — M Train
 Forgotten NY: Subways and Trains — Rockaway Branch
 Forgotten NY: Subways and Trains — Subway Signs to Nowhere
 The Subway Nut - 63rd Drive–Rego Park Pictures 
 63rd Road exit only stair from Google Maps Street View
 63rd Drive entrance from Google Maps Street View
 64th Road entrance from Google Maps Street View
 Platforms from Google Maps Street View

IND Queens Boulevard Line stations
New York City Subway stations in Queens, New York
Railway stations in the United States opened in 1936
1936 establishments in New York City